Gifford State Forest is the smallest state forest in the U.S. state of Ohio. It includes some hiking trails, forested hills and bluffs, and a small breeding nursery. It is located in Bern Township, Athens County. This forest was donated by William Gifford Selby in 1959 and is named after his mother Virginia Gifford.

References

External links
 U.S. Geological Survey Map at the U.S. Geological Survey Map Website. Retrieved November 21st, 2022.

Ohio state forests
Protected areas of Athens County, Ohio